The following events occurred in August 1903:

August 1, 1903 (Saturday)
Polish Cardinal Jan Puzyna de Kosielsko issues a veto (jus exclusivae) against the nomination of the front runner, Cardinal Mariano Rampolla, in the name of Emperor Franz Josef I of Austria. The veto is refused, but Rampolla loses some of his support.
Died: Calamity Jane (Martha Jane Canary), frontierswoman and professional scout, 51 (alcohol-related inflammation of the bowel and/or pneumonia)

August 2, 1903 (Sunday)
The Ilinden–Preobrazhenie Uprising, organized by the Secret Macedonian-Adrianople Revolutionary Organization, breaks out in the Ottoman provinces of Macedonia and Adrianople.
Pittencrieff Park in Dunfermline, Scotland, is gifted to the people of the town by Dunfermline native Andrew Carnegie.
One of the two crew members is killed.
The final of Sweden's 1903 Svenska Mästerskapet football tournament is won by Göteborgs IF.

August 3, 1903 (Monday)
Born:
 Habib Bourguiba, Tunisian lawyer and politician, President of Tunisia 1957–1987, in Monastir (d. 2000)
 Fahri Korutürk, Turkish naval officer and politician, President of Turkey 1973–80, in Constantinople, Ottoman Empire (d. 1987)

August 4, 1903 (Tuesday)
After five rounds of voting by the papal conclave, Pope Pius X (Giuseppe Melchiorre Sarto) succeeds Pope Leo XIII, becoming the 257th pope.
Born: Helen Kane, US singer, in New York City (died 1966)

August 5, 1903 (Wednesday)
Born: Prince Nicholas of Romania, second son of King Ferdinand I of Romania and his wife Queen Marie, at Peleş Castle, Sinaia. (died 1978)

August 6, 1903 (Thursday)
King Edward VII of the United Kingdom appoints Henry Northcote, 1st Baron Northcote, as the next Governor-General of Australia with effect from January 1904.
The 2nd Congress of the Russian Social Democratic Labour Party, presided over by Lenin, is forced by police action to relocate from Brussels, Belgium, to London, UK.
The second tropical cyclone of the season is observed east of the Windward Islands.

August 7, 1903 (Friday)
Over 20 people die in a rear end crash between two circus trains in Durand, Michigan. Chief Special Agent Albert W. Large of the Grand Trunk Railroad Police Department is killed and another special agent is seriously injured in the crash, which is caused by failure of the second train's air brakes.
Born: Louis Leakey, Kenyan paleoanthropologist and archaeologist, in Kabete, East Africa Protectorate (died 1972)

August 8, 1903 (Saturday)
The British government writes to other parties involved in the Berlin Conference of 1884–5, with details of abuses and atrocities in the Congo for which King Leopold II of Belgium was deemed responsible.
During a Philadelphia Phillies home game at Baker Bowl a balcony collapses, killing four people and injuring many more. The Phillies temporarily move to Columbia Park pending repairs.

August 9, 1903 (Sunday)
At his coronation ceremony, Pope Pius X shocks his entourage by wearing a simple pectoral cross made of gilded metal, which he says is the only one he owns.
The tropical storm observed on August 6 strikes Martinique, leaving thousands homeless in Fort-de-France and surrounding villages. Eight people are killed.
Kerry GAA defeat Cork GAA in the semi-final of the All-Ireland Senior Football Championship - Munster division at Millstreet.

August 10, 1903 (Monday)

Paris Métro train fire: After several attempts to extinguish a fire on the wooden-bodied Train 43–52, the flames get out of control and 84 people are killed, most at Couronnes station.
The Oseberg Ship, a 9th-century Viking ship, is discovered in a large burial mound at a farm near Tønsberg, Vestfold, Norway.

August 11, 1903 (Tuesday)
Two people are killed when an earthquake of magnitude 8.1 strikes Kythera, Greece.
A hurricane strikes Jamaica, devastating the island's northern shore and wrecking several ships. Between 65 and 90 people are killed.
Charles Sullivan and John H. Powell shoot and kill Special Policeman Robert A. Sample on Folsom Street in San Francisco, California. Sullivan will be convicted of second-degree murder in December; Powell will be convicted of manslaughter on January 2, 1904.
Died: Eugenio María de Hostos, 64, Puerto Rican lawyer, philosopher and campaigner

August 12, 1903 (Wednesday)
The hurricane that struck Jamaica on August 11 reaches the Cayman Islands, destroying 200 homes and seven churches on Grand Cayman alone.

August 13, 1903 (Thursday)

August 14, 1903 (Friday)
The Land Purchase (Ireland) Act 1903 is passed in the House of Commons of the United Kingdom, encouraging landlords to sell their Irish estates to tenants.

August 15, 1903 (Saturday)
The post of Commanding General of the United States Army is replaced by that of Chief of Staff of the Army; Samuel B. M. Young is the first to take the new title.

August 16, 1903 (Sunday)
The hurricane that has already devastated Jamaica dissipates over San Luis Potosí, Mexico, where it causes significant flooding in the area between Tampico and Cárdenas.

August 17, 1903 (Monday)
The Great Western Railway is the first British railway company to operate its own road motor services when it begins running buses between Helston and The Lizard in Cornwall.

August 18, 1903 (Tuesday)
German inventor Karl Jatho gets his motorized heavier-than-air aircraft up to 200 feet (60 m) above the ground.

August 19, 1903 (Wednesday)
Born: James Gould Cozzens, US novelist, in Chicago (died 1978)

August 20, 1903 (Thursday)

August 21, 1903 (Friday)
Captain Robert Falcon Scott, on his first Antarctic expedition, observes that the expedition's second long polar night has ended when he sees the sun's rim above the northern horizon.

August 22, 1903 (Saturday)
Died: Robert Gascoyne-Cecil, 3rd Marquess of Salisbury, 73, three time Prime Minister of the United Kingdom

August 23, 1903 (Sunday)
The Australian screw steamer Narara catches fire at her moorings at Sackville, New South Wales, Australia, and is scuttled. The ship was later refloated, repaired, and returned to service.

August 24, 1903 (Monday)
Laurence Doherty defeats William Clothier 6–3, 6–2, 6–3 in the Final of the U.S. Men's National Singles Championship, which took place a day late because of rain the previous day.
Born: Graham Sutherland, English artist, in Streatham (died 1980)

August 25, 1903 (Tuesday)
The Judiciary Act is passed in the Australian parliament, regulating the structure of Australia's judicial system and conferring jurisdiction on Australian federal courts.
Teresa Urrea's home in Los Angeles, United States, where she had been supporting Mexican workers, is destroyed by fire.

August 26, 1903 (Wednesday)

August 27, 1903 (Thursday)
Lord Northcote, Governor of Bombay, informs Lord George Hamilton that he and his wife are leaving India.

August 28, 1903 (Friday)
A reception is held at Poona, India, for the outgoing Governor of Bombay, Lord Northcote, with an estimated 7,000 people in attendance.

August 29, 1903 (Saturday)
George Ade's play, The County Chairman, is performed for the first time, at the Auditorium in South Bend, Indiana, United States.

August 30, 1903 (Sunday)

August 31, 1903 (Monday)
At Mount Vernon, workers begin waterproofing the limestone tomb of George Washington with a vulcanizing process.
Born: Arthur Godfrey, US broadcaster, in Manhattan (died 1983)

References

1903
1903-08
1903-08